Ian Douglas Macdonald (born 29 November 1945) is a former Australian politician who served as a Senator for Queensland from 1990 to 2019, representing the Liberal Party. He was Minister for Regional Services, Territories and Local Government (1998–2001) and Minister for Fisheries, Forestry and Conservation (2001–2006) in the Howard Government. He was defeated at the 2019 federal election, having been the longest-serving incumbent member of parliament for the final years of his career.

Early life 
Macdonald was born in Brisbane, Queensland, and was a solicitor before entering politics. He was also a Councillor in the Burdekin Shire Council 1979–90. He was Vice-President of the Liberal Party in Queensland from 1987 to 1990.

Early political career 
In 1992, Macdonald was appointed to the Opposition Shadow Ministry under Liberal leader John Hewson as Shadow Minister for Local Government and the Australian Capital Territory. In 1994, following Alexander Downer's accession to the party leadership, Macdonald was given the positions of Shadow Minister for Regional Development and Shadow Minister for Infrastructure and continued to serve at these positions under Opposition leader John Howard.

Howard Government 
Following the election of the Howard Government, Macdonald was appointed Parliamentary Secretary to the Minister for the Environment in 1996. In 1998, MacDonald was appointed to the Second Howard Ministry as Minister for Regional Services, Territories and Local Government.

In 2001, Macdonald was appointed Minister for Forestry and Conservation in the Third Howard Ministry. His portfolio was renamed Fisheries, Forestry and Conservation in November 2002. He continued in this position in the Fourth Howard Ministry until January 2006 when he lost his position in a Cabinet reshuffle triggered by the retirement of Robert Hill.

Return to Opposition 
Following the defeat of the Howard Government in 2007, Macdonald was appointed to the Opposition Shadow Ministry of Brendan Nelson as Shadow Minister Assisting the Leader of the Opposition and Shadow Minister for Northern Australia. On 22 September 2008, following the election of Malcolm Turnbull as Opposition Leader, Macdonald lost his position as Shadow Minister Assisting the Leader of the Opposition but retained the position of Shadow Parliamentary Secretary for Northern Australia.

In 2009, Macdonald lost his position in the Shadow Cabinet following Tony Abbott's accession to the Liberal leadership, but was appointed Shadow Parliamentary Secretary for Northern and Remote Australia. In 2010, he also took on the position of Shadow Parliamentary Secretary for the Defence Force and Defence Support.

Final years in parliament 
On 16 September 2013, following the election of the Abbott Government, it was announced that despite Tony Abbott's stated aim of ministry continuity Macdonald had been dropped from the frontbench. Senator Macdonald described this day as the "one of the worst" days in his life.

In June 2014, Macdonald joined Senator Cory Bernardi in expressing opposition to the Government's proposed deficit levy, claiming that he did not believe the increase "goes far enough." He also threatened to cross the floor over the proposed fuel excise hike.

In July 2018, Macdonald was demoted to fourth position on the LNP ticket, from which victory was considered very unlikely. In the 2019 federal election he lost his senate seat, and ceased to be a senator from 1 July 2019.

Controversy 
On 3 November 2011 during debate on carbon tax legislation, Macdonald stated "GetUp! is the Hitler Youth wing of the Greens political movement." Senator Macdonald stood by his comments when challenged. While he later apologised to the Jewish community for this remark, he did not withdraw the comment in Parliament. He also once likened Stephen Conroy to Joseph Goebbels.

In September 2015 during Senate Question Time, Macdonald made an interjection toward NSW Labor Senator Doug Cameron based on Cameron's strong and distinctive Scottish accent. Macdonald interjected 'learn to speak Australian'. SA Labor Senator Penny Wong interrupted proceedings later to have Macdonald withdraw his comment. Macdonald revised his comment to say "learn to speak Australian, mate".

On 9 February 2017, Macdonald stated that he was likely to oppose the Federal Government move to abolish the lifetime gold pass, entitling politicians who had been elected prior to 2012 to 10 free business class flights per year. ABC News reported that Macdonald stated in the Liberal Party Room that "it's about time someone stood up for politicians entitlements".

On 30 May 2017, the senator was on ABC Local Radio Darwin discussing the benefits of shifting public servants from Canberra to more regional areas such as Darwin and regional Queensland. He further went on to say that public servants should be sacked if they refuse to "get out of their very privileged lives" in Canberra, Sydney or Melbourne, after no public servants volunteered to move. 

On 9 April 2019, Macdonald asked if Penny Wong is related to Chinese billionaire Huang Xiangmo.

References

External links
 Summary of parliamentary voting for Senator Ian Macdonald on TheyVoteForYou.org.au

|-

|-

1945 births
Living people
Liberal National Party of Queensland members of the Parliament of Australia
Liberal Party of Australia members of the Parliament of Australia
Members of the Australian Senate
Members of the Australian Senate for Queensland
Members of the Cabinet of Australia
21st-century Australian politicians
20th-century Australian politicians